The 2011 British 125 Championship season was the 24th British 125cc Championship season. The 125cc Championship is a support category for the British Superbike Championship, the 125cc category is the only 2 stroke class left in the British Superbike Championship.

Calendar

Championship standings

Riders' Championship

ACU Academy Cup

References

External links
The official website of the British Superbike Championship

125 Championship